Bulbophyllum ceriodorum is a species of orchid in the genus Bulbophyllum. It is critically endangered due to wildfires and subsistence woodgathering.

References

The Bulbophyllum-Checklist
The Internet Orchid Species Photo Encyclopedia

ceriodorum